Vita Semerenko (born 18 January 1986) is a Ukrainian biathlete. She is Olympic champion in women's relay, Olympic medalist and multiple World championships medalist. She is one of the most successful Ukrainian winter athletes.

Biathlete Valentyna is her twin sister.

Career
When she was in the fourth grade of elementary school, she took up cross-country skiing together with her twin sister Valentyna. But later they decided to switch to biathlon. In 2005 she won two medals at Junior World Championships and one at Junior European Championships. Since the competition in Ukrainian national team was quite rigorous, only Valja managed to qualify for 2006 Winter Olympics.

In 2005–06 World Cup season she debuted in German Oberhof in women's relay which was her only World Cup race in that season. Next season she had her first World Cup race – individual race in Swedish Östersund where she with three misses finished 23rd as the best among Ukrainians. Her first World Cup podium came on 20 December 2008, in Austrian Hochfilzen, where she was second in sprint.

She also competes sometimes in summer biathlon competitions, including World and European championships. But Vita's greatest achievement in this modification of biathlon was in 2012 when she won City-Biathlon in Püttlingen, Germany, which was very popular among leading biathletes.

She won the silver medal in 4×6 km relay event at the Biathlon World Championships 2008. In the Olympic cycle between 2010 Winter Olympics and 2014 Winter Olympics she always was on the World Championships podiums winning bronze in individual in 2011, bronze in sprint in 2012 and bronze once again in sprint in 2013 (her teammate Olena Pidhrushna became then World Champion). Apart from her individual medals she also was second in women's relay in 2013.

She represented Ukraine at the 2010 Winter Olympics in Vancouver and at the 2014 Winter Olympics in Sochi. In Vancouver she was one of national hopes for a medal but she didn't achieve high results.

On 9 February 2014, she got her bronze medal in women's sprint competition thus winning the first medal for Ukraine at the 2014 Winter Olympics. On 21 February, together with Juliya Dzhyma, Valj Semerenko and Olena Pidhrushna she won the gold medal in the Women's relay at the 2014 Winter Olympics, in Sochi, Russia. This is still the greatest achievement for Ukraine in biathlon.

Due to illness, surgery and then pregnancy she missed almost three seasons, returning to competitions only in March 2016.

She qualified to represent Ukraine at the 2018 Winter Olympics. She competed in all personal races at the Games with 14th place in sprint being her personal best.

She received the Best Athlete of a Month award from National Olympic Committee of Ukraine for four times – in March 2009, March 2010, March 2011, March 2012.

Personal life
Vita is married to a footballer of a regional league Andriy Patsiuk. On 19 September 2016, she gave a birth to the son whose name is Mark.

She graduated from Sumy State Pedagogical Makarenko University.

Results

Winter Olympics

World Championships

World Cup

Individual podiums

Relay podiums

Positions

IBU Cup

Relay podiums

References

External links

Biathlon.com.ua

1986 births
Living people
Ukrainian female biathletes
Olympic biathletes of Ukraine
Biathletes at the 2010 Winter Olympics
Biathletes at the 2014 Winter Olympics
Biathletes at the 2018 Winter Olympics
Ukrainian twins
Twin sportspeople
Biathlon World Championships medalists
Medalists at the 2014 Winter Olympics
Olympic gold medalists for Ukraine
Olympic bronze medalists for Ukraine
Olympic medalists in biathlon
Dynamo sports society athletes
Universiade medalists in biathlon
Universiade gold medalists for Ukraine
Universiade silver medalists for Ukraine
Universiade bronze medalists for Ukraine
Competitors at the 2007 Winter Universiade
Competitors at the 2011 Winter Universiade
Laureates of the Prize of the Cabinet of Ministers of Ukraine for special achievements of youth in the development of Ukraine
Sportspeople from Sumy Oblast